Devastator is a name used by three fictional characters appearing in American comic books published by Marvel Comics.

Fictional character biography

Devastator (Kirov Petrovna)
The first Devastator was Soviet officer, spy, and saboteur Kirov Petrovna, who wore a suit of power armor designed by the Gremlin. Gremlin was told by the State that his father, the Gargoyle, had been killed by the Hulk, and the deformed super-scientist sought revenge. Petrovna infiltrated the Hulkbuster base in New Mexico, and smuggled in the Devastator suit. He attempted to destroy the base under his Soviet leader's orders. During the battle with the Hulk, the Hulk caused the energy in the suit's gauntlets to misdirect the microwave energy back into the suit, incinerating both suit and wearer.

Devastator (Gregori Larionov)
The second Devastator was another Soviet officer, using a version of the Devastator suit re-built by Soviet scientists using the Gremlin's notes (Gremlin had defected in the meantime). He was sent by the Soviet government along with his Soviet Super-Troopers to Khystym to execute the Gremlin. This time, Devastator was defeated by Gremlin and two Spaceknights (Rom and Starshine), and his satellite power source was destroyed.

Devastator (presumably the same one) was next seen battling the Crimson Dynamo in a training exercise.

Unnamed Devastator
In the pages of Avengers World, a third Devastator appears as a member of S.P.E.A.R. where he is a member of S.P.E.A.R.'s Ascendants.

Powers and abilities
The Devastator power armor was designed by the Gremlin. This full body armor is equipped with electronic devices which absorb microwave energy and can convert it for use as blasts of heat or concussive force. Its solar powered boot jets enable the wearer to fly at just under Mach 1, with range limited only by available light plus 3 hour battery reserve. The gauntlets contain microwave projectors that generate devastating force blasts. Because the battle-suit draws power from microwave energy beamed down from a satellite located in geosynchronous orbit, the suit's wearer must maintain a line-of-sight position relative to the satellite to avoid sudden power cut-off. The satellite itself was protected by ECMs which rendered it invisible to conventional modes of detection.

The second Devastator also possesses extensive hand-to-hand combat training, while the original possessed limited hand-to-hand combat training.

Transformers character
The Constructicon gestalt Devastator from The Transformers also appeared in Marvel (in comics and by Marvel Productions as a cartoon), making the third Marvel character to wear the name.

References

Comics characters introduced in 1975
Fictional Russian people
Fictional secret agents and spies in comics
Marvel Comics supervillains